Andraos Abouna (23 March 1943 – 27 July 2010) was the Chaldean Catholic titular bishop of Hirta and the auxiliary bishop of the Chaldean Catholic Patriarchate of Babylon. He is an ethnic Assyrian.

Biography
Ordained to the priesthood on 5 June 1960, he was named bishop on 6 November 2002 and was ordained on 6 January 2003.

See also

Notes

1943 births
2010 deaths
Chaldean bishops
Deaths from kidney failure
Iraqi Assyrian people
Iraqi Eastern Catholics